Government of the Republic of Artsakh is the executive branch of the government of the Republic of Artsakh. The executive council of government ministers is headed by the President of Artsakh. The 2017 constitutional referendum approved the transformation of the government into a presidential system; the office of the Prime Minister was thereby abolished.

Current government 

The incumbent government of Artsakh is led by President Arayik Harutyunyan who won the 2020 general election.

Leaders

Presidents of Artsakh

Prime Ministers of Artsakh

See also 

 National Assembly (Artsakh)
 Politics of Artsakh
 President of Artsakh

References